Rysa may refer to:

People
 Rysa Walker, American science fiction writer

Places
 Rysa Little, Scotland

Other
 Scratch (2008 film)